Clarkson Floyd Crosby (November 3, 1817 – February 22, 1858) was an American politician from New York.

Early life
Crosby was born on November 3, 1817.  He was one of twelve children born to William Bedlow Crosby (1786–1865) and Harriet Ashton (née Clarkson) Crosby (1786–1859).  His parents built one of Manhattan's largest houses, modeled after a Regency house in London, that occupied two blocks on Monroe Street (now known as Rutgers Place).

His paternal grandparents were Dr. Ebenezer Crosby and Catharine (née Bedlow) Crosby, who both died when his father was young; thereafter his father and his brother John Player Crosby were adopted by their bachelor uncle, Col. Rutgers, whose estate was worth a million dollars in 1830.  His maternal grandparents were Rev. William Clarkson of South Carolina, and Catherine (née Floyd) Clarkson, herself a daughter of Gen. William Floyd, a signer of the Declaration of Independence.

He was a graduate of Union College, located in Schenectady, New York, "but possessing an ample fortune never followed any profession."

Career
Crosby, a man of "vigorous intellect, earnest impusles, and cordial and impressive manners," was a member of the New York State Assembly (Albany Co.) in 1845. He was a presidential elector in 1848, voting for Zachary Taylor and Millard Fillmore.

He was a member of the New York State Senate (11th D.) in 1854 and 1855. While in the Senate, he served on the Select Committee.

Personal life
On September 8, 1838, he married Angelica Schuyler (1820–1896), daughter of John Schuyler and Maria (née Miller) Schuyler. They lived in Watervliet, New York, and had three children, including:

 John Schuyler Crosby (1839–1914), who married Harriet Van Rensselaer, youngest daughter of Gen. Stephen Van Rensselaer IV, and became the Governor of Montana Territory.
 Harriet Clarkson Crosby (1843–1895), who married William Augustus Thompson (1834–1903) in 1863.
 Eliza Maria Crosby (1857–1884), who married William M. Alexander (1845–1872) and Thaddeus Alexander Snively (1851–1913)

After an illness of several months, Crosby died on February 22, 1858, in New York City.  He was buried at the Green-Wood Cemetery in Brooklyn.

Descendants
Through his daughter Harriette, he was the grandfather of Clarkson Crosby Thompson, who married Elizabeth Winters; William Leland Thompson, who married Martha Groome; and Angelica Schuyler Thompson, who married Elbert Scranton.

Through his eldest son John, he was the grandfather of Stephen Van Rensselaer Crosby (1868–1959), who married Henrietta Marion Grew (sister-in-law of J. P. Morgan Jr.); and Angelica Schuyler Crosby (1872–1907), who married the diplomat John B. Henderson Jr., son of U.S. Senator John B. Henderson and Mary Foote Henderson.

References

External links

1817 births
1858 deaths
Union College (New York) alumni
Members of the New York State Assembly
New York (state) state senators
People from Watervliet, New York
New York (state) Whigs
19th-century American politicians
Burials at Green-Wood Cemetery
1848 United States presidential electors